The 20909 / 10 Kochuveli-Porbandar Superfast Express is a superfast train belonging to Indian Railways - Western Railway zone that runs between  in Thiruvananthapuram and  in India.

Coaches

The 20909 / 10  Kochuveli-Porbandar Superfast Express has 1 AC 2 tier, 5 AC 3 tier, 10 Sleeper Class, 1 Pantry Car, 4 General Unreserved & 2 SLR (Seating cum Luggage Rake) Coaches. 

As is customary with most train services in India, Coach Composition may be amended at the discretion of Indian Railways depending on demand.

Service

Route

Schedule

Traction

As large sections of the route are yet to be fully electrified, a Vatva based WDM-3A locomotive powers the train for its entire journey.

References

External links
20909 Kochuveli Porbandar Superfast Express at India Rail Info
20910 Porbandar Kochuveli Superfast Express at India Rail Info

Konkan Railway
Transport in Thiruvananthapuram
Express trains in India
Rail transport in Maharashtra
Rail transport in Goa
Rail transport in Karnataka
Rail transport in Kerala
Railway services introduced in 2012
Rail transport in Gujarat
Transport in Porbandar